Mogadore High School is a public high school in Mogadore, Ohio.  It is the only high school in the Mogadore Local School District.

State championships

 Boys football – 1954, 1979, 1996, 2002 
 Boys golf – 1971, 1972, 1973

Field House Fire 
On May 5 2018 a fire burned the football stadium field house to the ground. The district elected to build a new field house and install a new track and field turf at a cost of 6 million dollars. On September 19 2019 the new facilities opened and the new Mogadore Memorial Stadium was rededicated.

Notes and references

External links
 
 Mogadore Local School District website

High schools in Summit County, Ohio
Public high schools in Ohio